Tabriz International Exhibition Center, which is a complex with vast exhibition infrastructures, is located in the eastern part of Tabriz, Iran.  It holds varying exhibitions based on a yearly schedule.  There are 46 exhibitions scheduled for the current Iranian year.  The most famous fair is TEXPO, which is a general trade fair.  It was established in 1992 and normally is held August 4–9 every year. Along with this major fair, there are annual fairs for books, automobiles, building materials and construction equipment, tourism, carpets and many other exhibitions.

The complex includes 9 pavilions, with 40,000 square meters of indoor and 15,000 square meters of outdoor exhibition areas.

References

Tourist attractions in Tabriz
Convention centers in Iran
Buildings and structures in Tabriz
Economy of Iranian Azerbaijan